is a series of illustrated Japanese fictional short stories written by Agobarrier, Taku Fujimi, Jackson Ō, and Akira Moribayashi and illustrated by Aoi Nishimata, who are the main staff of the company Navel. It has been serialized in the magazine Etsu since 2002. The series has inspired a drama CD and a manga series.

Characters

Heroines

 (drama CD)

 (drama CD)

 (drama CD)

 (drama CD)

 (drama CD)

 (drama CD)

 (drama CD)

Heroes

 (drama CD)

 (drama CD)

 (drama CD)

Other

 (drama CD)

External links
Official website

2008 Japanese novels
2009 Japanese novels
Light novels
Manga series
Seinen manga